Amelora arotraea is a moth of the  family Geometridae. It is found in Australia, including Tasmania.

External links
Australian Faunal Directory

Moths of Australia
Nacophorini
Moths described in 1892